Prosidactus bartolozii is a species of beetle in the family Cerambycidae, and the only species in the genus Prosidactus. It was described by Teocchi et al. in 2010.

References

Ancylonotini
Beetles described in 2010
Monotypic beetle genera